Boulevard Selatan Station is a light rail station of the Jakarta LRT Line A. The station is located at East Kelapa Gading, Kelapa Gading, North Jakarta.

The station is one of the six stations of the first phase of Jakarta LRT Line A which opened on 1 December 2019.

Services

Gallery

References

North Jakarta
Jakarta LRT stations
Railway stations opened in 2019